Tom of Your Life is a 2020 American comedy-drama film directed by Jeremy Sklar, starring Jeremy Sklar, Baize Buzan, Dominic Rescigno, Joshua Paul and Judah Abner Paul.

Cast
 Baize Buzan as Jess
 Levi Emerson Paul as Tom (4)
 Judah Abner Paul as Tom (8)
 Joshua Paul as Tom (12)
 Dominic Rescigno as Tom (20s)
 Jeremy Sklar as Tom (28-104)
 James Sharpe as Carl
 Paul Tigue as Dennis
 Mike Nussbaum as Father McMurphy
 Bob Rusch as Grabowski
 Michael Saad as Socrates
 Chuck Sklar as Schmitty
 Annabel Steven as Madelyn
 Janelle James as Agent Parker
 Kara Zediker as Ana

Reception
Richard Roeper of Chicago Sun-Times rated the film 3.5 stars out of 4 and wrote that "each stop on this unique journey is handled with humor and warmth and grace."

Rob Rector of Film Threat gave the film a score of 8.5/10 and wrote that it is "captured and rendered stunningly" while Buzan is "outstanding, providing authentic, frantic frailty to her role as Jess".

References

External links
 
 

American comedy-drama films
2020 comedy-drama films